Joshua Philip Clackstone (born 18 September 1996) is an English professional footballer who plays as a defender for Alfreton Town.

Career
Born in Beverley, Clackstone began his career at Hull City, and signed on loan for Notts County in January 2017. He moved on loan to Halifax Town in November 2017.

He was released by Hull at the end of the 2017–18 season.

In July 2018, Clackstone signed for Alfreton Town.

Career statistics

References

1996 births
Living people
English footballers
Association football defenders
Hull City A.F.C. players
Notts County F.C. players
FC Halifax Town players
Alfreton Town F.C. players
English Football League players
National League (English football) players
Sportspeople from Beverley